J. Wentzel van Huyssteen (29 April 1942 - 18 February 2022) was a professor at Princeton Theological Seminary from 1992-2014. His official position was the James I. McCord Professor of Theology and Science. Born in South Africa, he was ordained as part of the Dutch Reformed Church in South Africa. He received his MA in philosophy from the Stellenbosch University in South Africa, and his PhD in philosophical theology from the Free University of Amsterdam. His areas of expertise are theology and science as well as religion and scientific epistemology. He was on the editorial board for the American Journal of Theology and Philosophy, the Nederduits Gereformeerde Teologiese Tydskrif, and the Journal of Theology and Science, and was coeditor of the Science and Religion Series (Ashgate Press). In 2004 he was selected to deliver the esteemed Gifford Lectures, in which he presented his work titled “Alone in the World? Science and Theology on Human Uniqueness.”
van Huysteen has also worked on cooperation with archaeologists, and has published an article on the development of self in Çatalhöyük.

Major publications
 Ashgate Science and Religion Series: Anna Case-Winters, Reconstructing a Christian Theology of Nature: Down to Earth, coedited with Roger Trigg. Series Editors (Adlershot: Ashgate Press, 2007)
 Alone in the World? Human Uniqueness in Science and Theology (Wm. B. Eerdmans Publishing Company, 2006) 
 The Encyclopedia of Science and Religion (Two volumes). Editor-in-chief (Macmillan Publishers, 2003)
 The Shaping of Rationality: Toward Interdisciplinarity in Theology and Science (Wm. B. Eerdmans Publishing Company, 1999) 
 Duet or Duel? Theology and Science in a Postmodern World (SCM/Trinity Press, 1998)
 Also, Christopher Lilley and Daniel J. Pedersen (Eds.), Human Origins and the Image of God: Essays in honor of J. Wentzel van Huyssteen (Wm. B. Eerdmans Publishing Company, 2017)

References

Living people
South African theologians
1942 births
Princeton Theological Seminary faculty